Omar Bongo Technical High School is situated in Libreville, Gabon.

It is among the largest secondary schools in Gabon with some 6,000 students. The technical school is named after Omar Bongo (1935 – 2009), former President of Gabon.

The school was temporarily shut down in January 2004 because of student lawlessness and the invasion of another school. A subsequent inquiry found that corruption and prostitution were endemic in the school.

See also

 Education in Gabon

References

External links 
 School: Sex work, fraud rife (12 February 2004). news.24.com. Retrieved 30 July 2020.
 "Gabon." Britannica Book of the Year, 2005 from Encyclopædia Britannica Premium Service. . Retrieved 29 September 2005.

Educational institutions with year of establishment missing
Buildings and structures in Libreville
High schools and secondary schools in Gabon
Technical schools